The Armenian Apostolic Diocese of Isfahan and Southern Iran,,  is Oriental Orthodox Christian diocese (or eparchy) of the Armenian Apostolic Church in New Julfa, Isfahan, Iran. It is within the ecclesiastical jurisdiction of the Catholicossate of the Great House of Cilicia, seated in Antelias, since 1960.

Before that it was called the Armenian Apostolic Diocese of Persia and India and was under the ecclesiastical jurisdiction of the Catholicossate of All Armenians in Vagharshapat. It was originally founded by Khachatur Kesaratsi after establishment of New Julfa in early 17th century.

The Diocese of Isfahan and Southern Iran is currently headed by Archbishop Sipan Kashchian.

List of Prelates

 Mesrop (1606–1620)
 Khachatour Kesaratsi (1620–1646)
 Davit I Jughayetsi (1652–1683)
 Stepanos Jughayetsi (1684–1696)
 Alexander Jughayetsi (1697–1706)
 Movses I Jughayetsi (1706–1725)
 Davit II Jughayetsi (1725–1728)
 Astvadsatour Farhabatsi (1729–1745)
 Poghos Jughayetsi (1748–1752)
 Gevorg Jughayetsi (1754–1768)
 Mkrtich Jughayetsi (1769–1787)
 Hakop Jughayetsi (ru) (1788–1791)
 Haroutioun Jughayetsi (1801–1810)
 Hovhannes I Echmiadsnetsi (1813–1817)
 Karapet Jughayetsi (1818–1831)
 Hovhannes II Bagrevandtsi (1832–1836)
 Khachatour II Vagharshapatsi (1838–1842)
 Hovhannes III Sourenian Ghrimetsi (1842–1848)
 Thadevos Begnazarian (1851–1863)
 Movses II Maghakian (1864–1871)
 Grigoris Hovhannisian (1872–1888)
 Yesai Astvadsatrian (1891–1896)
 Maghakia Terounian (1898–1901)
 Sahak Ayvatian (1902v1912, 1920–1922)
 Mesrop Ter Movsisian (1926–1930)
 Vahan Kostanian (1945–1949)
 Nerses Bakhtikian (1961–1965)
 Yeprem Tapagian (1965–1967)
 Ghevond Chepeyian (1968-1970)
 Garegin Sargsian (1971–1973)
 Mesrop Ashchian (1974–1977)
 Korioun Papian (1978–2002)
 Sipan Kashchian

See also
 Armenians in Iran

References

External links
 
 

Iran
Armenian Apostolic Church in Iran
Oriental Orthodox dioceses in Asia